Ongole mandal is one of the 56 mandals in Prakasam district of the state of Andhra Pradesh, India. It is administered under Ongole revenue division and its headquarters are located at Ongole. The mandal is bounded by Naguluppalapadu, Maddipadu, Santhanuthlapadu, and Kothapatnam Tangutur mandals. The mandals lies on the shore of Bay of Bengal.

History 
Ongole was once part of great historical regions of the world Kamma Rashtra.

Demographics 

 census, the mandal had a population of 253,122. The total population constitute, 126,983 males and 126,139 females —a sex ratio of 993 females per 1000 males. 24,500 children are in the age group of 0–6 years, of which 12,635 are boys and 11,865 are girls —a ratio of 939 per 1000. The average literacy rate stands at 79.91% with 182,682 literates.

Towns and villages 

 census, the mandal has 17 settlements, that includes:

Sources:
Census India 2011 (sub districts)
 Revenue Department of AP

See also 
Prakasam district

References

Mandals in Prakasam district